Sergeant is a police or military rank.

Sergeant may also refer to:

Entertainment
Sergeant (band), an indie band from Glenrothes, Scotland
Sergeant (Ender's Shadow), a character in Orson Scott Card's novel Ender's Shadow
The Sergeant (1910 film) 
The Sergeant (1968 film), a 1968 drama starring Rod Steiger
The Sergeant (1991 film) Iranian film directed by Masoud Kimiai
The Sergeant (Gordon Davis), a series of pulp novels by Len Levinson (unrelated to the film)

Other uses
Sergeant (surname)
Sergeant Township, Pennsylvania, United States
Sergeant's Crag, Lake District, England
Sergeant (Sweden and Finland), a military rank
MGM-29 Sergeant, a US short-range rocket of the 1960s
Sergeants, butterflies in the genus Athyma

See also 

 Sargant (disambiguation) 
 Sargent (disambiguation)
 Serjeant (disambiguation)